This is a list of villages in Mahnar block, Vaishali district, Bihar state, India.

See also

List of villages in Chowk in mahnar,Vaishali district

References

Lists of villages in Vaishali district
Mahnar